Dumanlı can refer to:

 Dumanlı
 Dumanlı, Gümüşhacıköy
 Dumanlı, Kurşunlu
 Dumanlı, Lapseki